Paru Gambhir is an Indian Bollywood actress. She has appeared in several Bollywood movies and is best known for her role in the movie Strings of Passion.

Career
Paru Gambhir made her debut in 2008 with the movie Dhin Tak Dha and has subsequently appeared in several other Bollywood films.

Filmography

Films

See also

Cinema of India
Bollywood

References 

Actresses from Mumbai
Living people
Actresses in Hindi cinema
Date of birth unknown
Indian film actresses
21st-century Indian actresses
Year of birth missing (living people)